Valsøybotnen is a village in Heim Municipality in Trøndelag county, Norway. The area was once part of the old municipalities of Valsøyfjord and later Halsa.

References

Heim, Norway
Villages in Trøndelag